Shenetal or Shenatal may refer to:
 Shenatal-e Olya
 Mazraeh-ye Shenatal-e Sofla
 Shenetal Rural District